The 1963 NAIA Soccer Championship was the fifth annual tournament held by the NAIA to determine the national champion of men's college soccer among its members in the United States.

Castleton State and Earlham were declared co-champions after the final match was cancelled due to a snowstorm. It was the first NAIA national title for both the Spartans and the Quakers. 

The cancelled final was due to be played at Frostburg State College in Frostburg, Maryland.

Bracket

See also  
 1963 NCAA Soccer Championship

References 

NAIA championships
NAIA
NAIA
1963 in sports in Maryland